Linda Evans (born Linda Evenstad; November 18, 1942) is an American actress known primarily for her roles on television. In the 1960s she played Audra Barkley, the daughter of Victoria Barkley (played by Barbara Stanwyck) in the Western television series The Big Valley (1965–1969). She is best known for portraying Krystle Carrington in the 1980s ABC primetime soap opera Dynasty, a role she played from 1981 to 1989.

Early life
Evans, the second of three daughters, was born Linda Evenstad in Hartford, Connecticut, on November 18, 1942, to Arlene (née Dart) and Alba Evenstad, both of whom were professional dancers. "Evenstad" was the name of the small farm in Nes, Hedmark, in Norway from where her paternal great-grandmother emigrated to the United States in 1884 with her young son (Evans' grandfather) and a few relatives. She has two sisters: Carol Davidson and Kathy Evenstad. When Evans was six months old, the family moved from Hartford to North Hollywood. She attended Hollywood High School, where she was a sorority sister of future actress Carole Wells. Her introduction to drama came through classes that she took "as a form of therapy, to cure her of her shyness." When she started her professional career, she changed her last name to "Evans".

Career
Evans' first guest-starring role was on a 1960 episode of Bachelor Father. The series starred John Forsythe, with whom she would costar 20 years later on Dynasty. After several guest roles in The Adventures of Ozzie and Harriet between 1960 and 1962, and guest appearances on television series such as The Lieutenant and Wagon Train, Evans gained her first regular role in 1965 in The Big Valley. Playing Audra Barkley, daughter of Victoria Barkley (played by Barbara Stanwyck), Evans was credited in the series until it ended in 1969, though she was only a semiregular cast member during the last two seasons.

On December 31, 1967, John Derek recruited his future wife to operate one of his cameras after he had been commissioned by daredevil Evel Knievel to film his motorcycle jump of the fountains at Caesars Palace in Las Vegas.  Evans photographed Knievel's devastating crash after the jump failed.

Throughout the 1970s, Evans continued to appear on television largely in guest roles. She appeared in a slew of detective shows such as The Rockford Files with James Garner, Mannix, Harry O with David Janssen, Banacek with George Peppard, McCloud with Dennis Weaver, and McMillan & Wife with Rock Hudson. In 1977, she starred with James Franciscus and Ralph Bellamy in the espionage drama series Hunter, though the show lasted for only 13 episodes.

In films, Evans co-starred with Lee Marvin and Robert Shaw in a 1979 thriller, Avalanche Express, and in 1980, she co-starred in one of Steve McQueen's final films, the Western Tom Horn.

Evans was next cast as Krystle Carrington in Aaron Spelling's opulent new primetime soap opera, Dynasty, which premiered in January 1981. Intended as ABC's answer to the hit CBS series Dallas, Dynasty featured Evans as the former secretary and new wife of millionaire oil tycoon Blake Carrington, portrayed by her former costar John Forsythe. Although initially sluggish in the ratings, audience figures improved after the show was revamped and British actress Joan Collins was brought in to play opposite Evans and Forsythe as Blake's scheming ex-wife, Alexis Carrington. By the 1984–85 season, Dynasty was the number one show on American television, outranking Dallas.

Evans won a Golden Globe Award for Best Actress in a Television Drama Series for her Dynasty role in 1981, and was subsequently nominated every year from 1982 to 1985. She was nominated for a Primetime Emmy Award for Outstanding Lead Actress in a Drama Series in 1983. Evans won a People's Choice Award for Favorite Female Performer in a New TV Program in 1982, and for Favorite Female TV Performer in 1983, 1984, 1985, and 1986. She won a Soap Opera Digest Award for Outstanding Lead Actress in 1984 and 1985.

Evans was hired as a spokesperson for the beverage Crystal Light due to her character's name.

Evans left Dynasty in 1989, four months before the series came to an end, after only appearing in six episodes of the 22-episode ninth and final season. After leaving Dynasty, Evans semiretired from acting and made only occasional television appearances. Instead, she devoted her time to fitness issues and set up a small chain of fitness centers. In the 1990s, Evans hosted infomercials for Rejuvenique, a mask for toning facial muscles. She had previously written the Linda Evans Beauty and Exercise book in 1983. She also kept in touch with Forsythe, until he died on April 1, 2010, and she was  devastated by his death. Evans first met Forsythe as an unfamiliar actress aged 18, for her first speaking part: Her agent "signed me up for Bachelor Father and John Forsythe gave me my first speaking part."

In 1991, Evans returned to the role of Krystle Carrington for the television miniseries Dynasty: The Reunion. Following this, she appeared in three made-for-TV movies in the 1990s, but then retired from screen acting altogether in 1997.

In 2005, actress Melora Hardin portrayed Evans in Dynasty: The Making of a Guilty Pleasure, a fictionalized television movie based on the creation and behind-the-scenes production of Dynasty.

In 2006, Evans reunited with her Dynasty castmates for the nonfiction reunion special Dynasty: Catfights and Caviar. She then starred in the stage play Legends opposite her former Dynasty rival Collins. In 2009, Evans appeared in and won the British TV program Hell's Kitchen, working under Michelin-starred chef Marco Pierre White.

Evans has a star on the Hollywood Walk of Fame at 6834 Hollywood Boulevard in Hollywood, California.

Personal life
In her late teens, Evans was engaged to Patrick Curtis, who later became a press agent and married Raquel Welch. Subsequently, Evans has been married and divorced twice. Her first marriage was to actor, photographer, and film director John Derek. They started dating in 1965, married in 1968, and separated on Christmas Day 1973, when Derek disclosed his affair with Bo Derek, who was 30 years his junior, and was 17 years old at the time. Evans' second marriage was to Stan Herman, a property executive, from 1975 to 1979. She then lived with restaurant owner George Santo Pietro, from 1980 to 1984. Evans also dated The Big Valley castmate Lee Majors for a brief period following her second divorce, as well as businessmen Richard Cohen (an ex-husband of Tina Sinatra) and Dennis Stein (a former fiancé of Elizabeth Taylor) during the mid-1980s. In 1989, Evans began a relationship with new-age musician Yanni, which lasted until 1998.

Her best friends are her ex-stepdaughter, television writer Sean Catherine Derek, and Bunky Young, Evans' former assistant, whom she has known since the mid-1960s; both reside near her in Washington state. She is also close with John's Europe-based second wife, Ursula Andress, a sometime houseguest at her home in Beverly Hills.

After being diagnosed with idiopathic edema, Evans began investigating alternative healing, delving into Eastern philosophy and naturopathy. In 1985, she became involved with controversial metaphysical teacher J. Z. Knight and her Ramtha's School of Enlightenment and eventually moved to Rainier, Washington to be closer to Knight and her school. Evans resides on a  estate that she shares with her sister, nephew and ex-stepdaughter.

Evans appeared in Playboy magazine at the behest of her then-husband John Derek in 1971. As she gained tremendous fame on Dynasty, the photos were published a second time in 1982.

Evans was arrested in May 2014 for driving under the influence of a prescription.

Filmography

Film

Television

References

External links

 
 
  
 
 

1942 births
Living people
Actresses from Hartford, Connecticut
Actresses from Los Angeles
American people of Norwegian descent
American television actresses
American soap opera actresses
Best Drama Actress Golden Globe (television) winners
Reality cooking competition winners
20th-century American actresses
21st-century American actresses